Minin may refer to:

Minin (surname)
Minin and Pozharsky (disambiguation)
Russian cruiser Minin
MV Kuzma Minin, Russian bulk carrier
 8134 Minin, an asteroid named after Kuzma Minin